Pasionaria is a Venezuelan telenovela written by Vivel Nouel and produced by Venevisión in 1990.
Catherine Fulop and Fernando Carrillo starred as the main protagonists with Henry Galue and Yolanda Méndez as the main antagonists. The telenovela was distributed internationally by Venevisión International.

Synopsis
Pasionaria is the story of Barbara and Jesús Alberto. Barbara Santana is a lively and enthusiastic girl, but she suffers from a dark secret that keeps her up at night and gives her no peace; seven years ago, she was the victim of rape and had a child she never saw, as her aunt made her believe the child died while she actually took her to an orphanage. Jesús Alberto is a young, ambitious mechanic with very strong Catholic principles, and he adores his wife and young daughter. When Barbara comes into his life, he is stirred with feelings beyond his control and tries to fight the passion to which he is very attracted. Although Barbara knows he is married, she pursues him and subdues him into an extramarital affair that breaks all the rules. Barbara and Myriam, the wife of Jesús Alberto become close friends, and when she falls sick and is near death, Myriam requests Barbara to remain by her husband's and daughter's side when she will no longer be there. Although Barbara is open, independent and carefree, Jesús Alberto is traditional, methodical and extremely chauvinistic, thereby leading to a clash in their personalities.

Cast
Catherine Fulop as Barbara Santana de Monteverde
Fernando Carrillo as Jesus Alberto Tovar Urdaneta
Andreina Sanchez as Miriam de Tovar
Elluz Peraza as Elizabeth Montiel
Henry Galue as Eliseo Monteverde
Raul Xiques as Ezequiel Santana
Yolanda Mendez as Nena Duarte de Santana
Maria Eugenia Domingues as Soledad Duarte
Vangie Labalan as Virqinia Qiara
Mahuampi Acosta as Mimina
Angelica Arenas as Chiquinquira Tovar
Carlos Arreaza as Quelito
Ernesto Balzi as Luis Felipe Parra
Rafael Briceño as Pedro Pedroza
Marisela Buitriago as Raiza
Teresa Cardenas as Dianita
Manuel Carrillo as Pedro Tovar
Carolina Cristancho as Cherry Gonzalez de la Reca
Elena Dinisio as Maya Nieves Ibarra
Francisco Ferrari as Jesus Urdaneta
Carolina Gentile as Eloisa Monteverde Santana
Mauricio González as Mauricio González de la Reca
Mirella Larotonda as Cachita
Estefania Lopez as Alambrito
Esperanza Magaz as Renata
Alberto Marin as Jose Tovar

See also
List of famous telenovelas
List of programs broadcast by Venevision

References

External links
Opening Credits

1990 telenovelas
Venevisión telenovelas
1990 Venezuelan television series debuts
1990 Venezuelan television series endings
Spanish-language telenovelas
Venezuelan telenovelas
Television shows set in Venezuela